Albert Muylle was a Belgian cyclist. He competed in the team pursuit event at the 1928 Summer Olympics.

References

External links
 

Year of birth missing
Possibly living people
Belgian male cyclists
Olympic cyclists of Belgium
Cyclists at the 1928 Summer Olympics
Place of birth missing